Honddu Isaf is a community in Powys, situated immediately to the north of Brecon on either side of the B4520 road to Builth Wells. It is in the historic county of Brecknockshire.

Description
The community includes the villages of Lower Chapel, Castle Madoc, Pwllgloyw, Sarnau Garthbrengi and Llandefaelog Fach. In the census of 2011 the population was 445.

There are 2 churches, which continue to hold services in the council area, one at Llandefaelog and one in Lower Chapel. There are also 2 chapels one in Lower Chapel and a second between Lower Chapel and Pwllgloyw adjacent to the B4520. There is a pub in Pwllgloyw, no retail premises and no concentrations of business premises in the area. There are a number of public footpaths and bridleways traversing the community council area.

There is an ancient Motte at Castle Madoc.

References

External links
Honddu Isaf Community Council website

Communities in Powys